The 2021–22 season was the eighth season in Kerala Blasters FC's existence, as well as their eighth season in Indian Super League. The 2021–22 Indian Super League season began on 19 November 2021, and it end on 20 March 2022 with all the matches held in Goa across three venues, same like the previous season due to the COVID-19 pandemic in India.

The Blasters played the most number of pre-season friendlies among all ISL clubs prior to the start of league season. In this season, the Blasters made their debut in the Durand Cup by participating in the tournament's 2021 edition, but was knocked out in the group stages of the tournament. The club had a serious change in the rosters, as they appointed Ivan Vukomanović as their new manager for the season, and released all the foreign players from the last season and recruited the likes of Adrián Luna, Jorge Pereyra Díaz, Álvaro Vázquez, Enes Sipović and Chencho Gyeltshen. They also signed several young Indian players and the experienced players like Harmanjot Khabra and Karanjit Singh from the summer and winter transfer windows respectively.

The Blasters played their first match in the league in the opening match of the season against ATK Mohun Bagan, which they ended up losing 4–2. Since their defeat in the opening match of the season, the Blasters went unbeaten for the next ten matches until they were beaten by the southern rivals Bengaluru in January 2022. In between the unbeaten run, the Blasters moved to the top spot in league table for the first time in seven years during the middle of the season following their 2–0 victory over Odisha in the same month. In the same season, the Blasters qualified for the playoffs of the ISL for the first time since 2016, after the Blasters' place in the fourth position was sealed after the Mumbai City lost their deciding match against Hyderabad in the month of March. At the end of the regular season, the Blasters broke several club records like the most number of wins and clean-sheets in a season, most number of points-per-game, most number of points in a season, and ended the season with a positive goal difference for the first time in the club's history.

The Blasters played the league winners Jamshedpur in the both legs of the semi-finals. They played the first leg of the semi-final on 11 March, which the Kerala Blasters won after Sahal Abdul Samad scored the only goal in the match, as the Blasters won 0–1 at full-time. They progressed through to the finals, as the second leg ended in a 1–1 draw and the Blasters qualified with an aggregate score of 2–1 on 15 March.

Kerala Blasters met Hyderabad in the final on 20 March. The Blasters found the lead through Rahul KP's goal in the 68th minute, but Hyderabad equalised the goal in the 88th minute of the game. After the match went goalless in the injury time and the extra time, the match went to penalty shoot-out, and the Blasters lost the shoot-out by 3–1. The Blasters thus became the runner-ups for the third time in their history.

Season overview

March, April and May 

On 19 March 2021, Kerala Blasters announced the signing of left-back Sanjeev Stalin from Portuguese third division club C.D. Aves on a three-year deal.

On 8 April, the Blasters announced the signing of young center-back Ruivah Hormipam from I-League club Punjab FC on a three-year deal.

On 6 May, the Blasters announced the contract extension of Denechandra Meitei until 2024.

June 

On 4 June, the Blasters announced the departure of Lalruatthara.

On 6 June, the Blasters announced Ritwik Das, Rohit Kumar and Shaiborlang Kharpan have left the club as their contract ran out.

On 12 June, the Blasters announced that Gary Hooper, Jordan Murray, Costa Nhamoinesu, Bakary Koné, Facundo Pereyra and Vicente Gómez, the six foreign players has left the club as their contract came to an end.

On 17 June, the Blasters roped in Ivan Vukomanović as their new head coach and Patrick Van Kets from Waasland-Beveren as the new assistant coach.

July 

On 1 July, the Blasters announced SIX5SIX as the official kit and merchandise partner on a three-year deal.

On 8 July, the Blasters announced the signing of Vincy Barretto on a three-year deal for an undisclosed transfer fee.

On 10 July, the Blasters announced Werner Martens as their new strength and conditioning coach and Slaven Progoveki as their goalkeeping coach respectively.

On 15 July, the Blasters announced the signing of Harmanjot Khabra on a two-year deal.

On 21 July, the Blasters announced their 29-men squad for the pre-season camp starting on 31 July in Kochi.

On 22 July, the Blasters announced the signing of Adrián Luna as their first foreign signing of the season on a two-year deal.

On 31 July, the Blasters announced the signing of Enes Sipović on a one–year deal. He thus became the first Bosnian player to play for the club.

August 

On 19 August, the Blasters announced the contract extension of Givson Singh until 2024.

On 20 August, the Blasters played their first pre-season friendly match against Kerala United FC, where they lost it 0–1.

On 24 August, the Blasters confirmed their participation in the 2021 Durand Cup. This was the club's debut Durand Cup campaign.

On 27 August, the Blasters played their second pre-season friendly match against Kerala United FC, which ended up in a 3–3 draw.

On 27 August, the Blasters announced the loan signing of Jorge Pereyra Díaz on a season long deal.

On 30 August, the Blasters announced the signing of Álvaro Vázquez on a one-year deal.

On 31 August, the Blasters announced the departure of Subha Ghosh to SC East Bengal on a season long loan deal.

On 31 August, the Blasters announced the signing of Chencho Gyeltshen as their AFC affiliated player of the season.

On 31 August, the Blasters announced the departure of Naorem Mahesh Singh to East Bengal on a season long loan deal.

September 

On 1 September, the Blasters announced that they have mutually parted ways with Bilal Khan.

On 1 September, the Blasters announced their 29-men squad for the 2021 Durand Cup.

On 3 September, the Blasters played their third pre-season friendly match against J&K Bank Football Club, which they won 2–0.

On 10 September, the Blasters announced their partnership with PhonePe as their official payments partner.

On 11 September, the Blasters played their debut match in the Durand Cup against Indian Navy, which they won 0–1 after Adrián Luna netted a penalty in the 71st minute of the game.

On 13 September, the FSDL announced the fixtures for first 11 rounds of the 2021–22 Indian Super League season. Once again, it was determined that the season opener would feature a match between ATK Mohun Bagan and the Blasters.

On 14 September, the Blasters announced their extension of association with Byju's as their title sponsor of for the upcoming season.

On 15 September, the Blasters played their second match in the Durand Cup against rivals Bengaluru FC, which they lost 2–0, after going down to 8-men after a series of red cards.

On 16 September, the Blasters announced the signing of Croatian, Marko Lešković, as their last foreign player of the season on a one-year deal.

On 16 September, the Blasters announced their partnership with the Government of Kerala for operating the Sports Kerala Elite Residential Football Academy in Thiruvananthapuram on a five-year deal.

On 20 September, the Blasters launched their home-kit for the upcoming season. The jersey was a homage to the Kerala football team that won the 1973 Santosh Trophy 

On 21 September, the Blasters played Delhi FC in their last match in the group stages of the 2021 Durand Cup, which they lost 1–0, resulting in their elimination from the tournament.

On 23 September, the Blasters announced their returning date to Kochi from Kolkata after their Durand Cup exit, and their plans to continue pre-season games and trainings ahead of the upcoming season.

On 26 September, the Blasters launched their away-kit for the upcoming season. The jersey was a homage to the fans of the club.

October 

On 2 October, the Blasters announced rest of their friendly matches in the pre-season happening in Kochi.

On 8 October, the Blasters played their fourth pre-season friendly match against Indian Navy, which they won 2–0.

On 12 October, the Blasters played their fifth pre-season friendly match against MA Football Academy, which they won 3–0.

On 14 October, the Blasters announced rest of their fixtures in the pre-season.

On 15 October, the Blasters was supposed to play their first pre-season friendly in Goa against FC Goa, which was cancelled due to bad weather.

On 19 October, the Blasters announced their extension of association with Ather Energy as one of their official partners for the upcoming season.

On 25 October, the Blasters launched their third-kit for the upcoming season.

November 

On 1 November, the Blasters played their sixth pre-season friendly match against Odisha FC, which they won 2–1.

On 2 November, the Blasters announced their squad for the 2021–22 Indian Super League season.

On 3 November, the Blasters announced their extension of association with BodyFirst as the team's official Nutrition Partner for the upcoming season.

On 5 November, the Blasters played their seventh pre-season friendly match against Chennaiyin FC, which they won 2–1.

On 9 November, the Blasters played their eighth pre-season friendly match against Jamshedpur FC, which they lost 0–3.

On 12 November, the Blasters played their final pre-season friendly match against Jamshedpur FC, which ended in a 1–1 draw.

On 13 November, the Blasters announced Jessel Carneiro as the club captain ahead of the new season.

On 14 November, the Blasters announced Stéphane van der Heyden as their assistant coach.

On 15 November, the Blasters announced Sporjo as their recruitment partner for the upcoming season.

On 16 November, the Blasters announced Exchange22 as their main sponsor for the upcoming season.

On 18 November, the Blasters announced Floki Inu as their sleeve sponsor for the upcoming season.

On 19 November, the Blasters announced Socios as their fan toke partner in a multi-year partnership.

On 19 November, the Blasters played their first match of the 2021–22 Indian Super League season against ATK Mohun Bagan, which they lost 4–2.

On 22 November, the Blasters announced that Rahul K. P. would exit the bio-bubble in Goa, after he was contracted with an injury in the match against ATK Mohun Bagan.

On 25 November, the Blasters played their second match of the season against NorthEast United FC, which ended in a 0–0 draw.

On 28 November, the Blasters played their third match of the season against arch-rivals Bengaluru FC, which ended in a 1–1 draw.

December 
On 4 December, the Blasters announced MOURI Tech as one of their partners for the occurring season.

On 5 December, the Blasters registered their first victory of the season against Odisha FC by a score of 2–1.

On 11 December, the Blasters announced that the goalkeeper Albino Gomes has been ruled out indefinitely due to injury that he sustained during the match against Odisha.

On 12 December, the Blasters played their fifth match of the season against SC East Bengal, which ended in a 1–1 draw.

On 13 December, the Blasters gave a statement on the complaint they filed to AIFF regarding the poor refereeing measures in the past two fixtures.

On 17 December, the Blasters provided a statement on the injuries sustained by Enes Sipović and Harmanjot Khabra.

On 19 December, the Blasters won their second game of season against defending champions Mumbai City FC with a score of 0–3.

On 20 December, the Blasters announced Suguna Foods' brand, Delfrez as their associate partner for the occurring season.

On 21 December, the Blasters announced the signing of Karanjit Singh as a replacement for the injured keeper Albino Gomes.

On 22 December, the Blasters won their third game of the season against rivals Chennaiyin FC on 22 December with a score of 0–3.

On 23 December, the Blasters announced the loan departure of Sreekuttan V. S. and Abdul Hakku to Gokulam Kerala FC for the 2021–22 I-League season.

On 26 December, the Blasters played their eight match of the season against Jamshedpur FC, which ended in a 1–1 draw.

On 29 December, the Blasters announced the loan departure of Seityasen Singh to Hyderabad FC for the rest of the season.

January 
On 2 January, the Blasters played their ninth match of the season against FC Goa, which ended in a dramatic 2–2 draw.

On 9 January, the Blasters won their fourth game of the season against Hyderabad FC, which ended in a climactic 1–0 victory.

On 10 January, the Blasters gave a statement on the injury sustained by the captain Jessel Carneiro during the match against Hyderabad on the previous day.

On 11 January, the Blasters announced their association with Nestlé Munch as their official crunch partner for the occurring season.

On 12 January, the Blasters won their fifth game of the season in their second match of the season against Odisha, which they won 2–0 and reclaimed the first spot in the table.

On 16 January, the Blasters second match against Mumbai City were postponed due to the COVID-19 outbreak in the bio-bubble.

On 19 January, it was announced that the Blasters' match against ATK Mohun Bagan in the next day was postponed due to them being unable to field a team as a result of the COVID-19 outbreak in the camp.

On 30 January, the Blasters played their second game of the season against Bengaluru in the Southern Derby, which they lost 0–1, thus giving an end their 10-match unbeaten streak.

February 
On 4 February, the Blasters won their sixth match of the season against NorthEast United, which ended in a dramatic 2–1 victory.

On 10 February, the Blasters played their second match of the season against Jamshedpur, which they lost 3–0.

On 12 February, the Blasters gave a statement on the injury sustained by Ruivah Hormipam during the match against Jamshedpur, two days back.

On 14 February, the Blasters won their seventh match of the season against East Bengal, which they won 1–0.

On 19 February, the Blasters played their rescheduled match against ATK Mohun Bagan, which ended in a 2–2 draw.

On 23 February, the Blasters forward Pereyra Díaz was charged with violent conduct by the All India Football Federation Disciplinary Committee for his actions after being substituted in the match against ATK Mohun Bagan four days back.

On 23 February, the Blasters played their second match of the season against Hyderabad, which they lost 2–1.

On 26 February, the Blasters won their eighth match of the season against Chennaiyin, which they won 3–0.

March 
On 2 March, the Blasters defender Harmanjot Khabra was charged with violent conduct and was fined ₹1.5 lakh by the All India Football Federation Disciplinary Committee for 'hitting an opponent' in the match against Hyderabad in February.

On 2 March, the Blasters won their ninth match of the season against Mumbai City, which they won 3–1.

On 5 March, the Blasters qualified for the league playoffs for the first time since 2016 following the Mumbai City's 2–1 defeat over Hyderabad.

On 6 March, the Blasters played their last match of the regular season against Goa, which ended in a dramatic 4–4 draw.

On 11 March, the Blasters won the first leg of their semi-final match against Jamshedpur, which ended in a 0–1 victory.

On 15 March, the Blasters drew the second leg of their semi-final match against Jamshedpur, which ended in a 1–1 draw, and the Blasters qualified for the ISL finals for the first time in 6 years.

On 20 March, the Blasters played the final against Hyderabad, which they lost 3–1 in penalty shoot-out.

Players
Note: The list contains all the players who were registered by the club for the 2021–22 Indian Super League season.

Transfers

Transfers In

Loan Returns

Promoted from Kerala Blasters FC Reserves

Contract Extensions

Loan Outs

Transfers Out

Management

Pre-season and friendlies
In July, the Blasters announced their squad for the pre-season camp in Kochi.

Competitions

Overview

Durand Cup

Group stage

Matches

Indian Super League

League table

League Results by Round

Matches
Note: The initial fixtures were announced in September 2021, and the rest of the matches in December. But the fixtures were revised in January 2022 after a series of COVID-19 cases led to the postponement of several matches.

Indian Super League Playoffs

Matches 

Kerala Blasters defeated Jamshedpur on the aggregate score of 2–1.

Statistics 
All stats are correct as of 20 March 2022

Squad appearances and goals

|-
!colspan=16 style="background:#FFFF00; color:#1047AB;"| Goalkeepers

|-
!colspan=16 style="background:#1047AB; color:#FFFF00;"| Defenders

|-
!colspan=16 style="background:#FFFF00; color:#1047AB;"| Midfielders

|-
!colspan=16 style="background:#1047AB; color:#FFFF00;"| Forwards

|}
Source: World Football

Squad statistics 

Players Used: 27

Goalscorers

Source: Indian Super League

Assist 

Source: Indian Super League

Clean-sheets

Source: Indian Super League

Disciplinary record

Source: World Football

Injury record

Seasonal awards

Indian Super League 

 2021–22 Indian Super League Golden Glove: Prabhsukhan Gill.

Kerala Blasters 

 Kerala Blasters Fans' Player of the Season: Adrián Luna.

Club awards

Indian Super League

ISL Hero of the Month award 
This is awarded after the voting done by the fans and the experts in the Indian Super League.

ISL Emerging Player of the Month award 
This is awarded after the voting done by the experts in the Indian Super League.

ISL Fans' Goal of the Week award 
This is awarded weekly to the players chosen by fans voting at the Indian Super League website.

ISL MVP of the Week award 
This is awarded weekly to the players chosen by the Indian Super League.

Kerala Blasters

Kerala Blasters Fans' Player of the Month award 
Note: This is awarded monthly to the players of Kerala Blasters as chosen by the fans via voting in their social media platforms.

Kerala Blasters Fans' Goal of the Month award 
Note: This is awarded monthly to the players of Kerala Blasters as chosen by the fans via voting in their social media platforms.

See also
 Kerala Blasters FC
 List of Kerala Blasters FC seasons
 Indian Super League
 2021–22 Indian Super League season

Notes

References

Kerala Blasters FC seasons
Kerala Blasters FC